The Senior men's race at the 2003 IAAF World Cross Country Championships was held at the L'Institut Équestre National in Avenches near Lausanne, Switzerland, on March 30, 2003.  Reports of the event were given in The New York Times, in the Herald,  and for the IAAF.

Complete results for individuals, for teams, medallists, and the results of British athletes who took part were published.

Race results

Senior men's race (12.355 km)

Individual

Teams

Note: Athletes in parentheses did not score for the team result (n/s: nonscorer)

Participation
According to an unofficial count, 113 athletes from 37 countries participated in the Senior men's race.

 (1)
 (1)
 (4)
 (1)
 (4)
 (6)
 (5)
 (4)
 (6)
 (6)
 (1)
 (1)
 (4)
 (3)
 (1)
 (6)
 (1)
 (1)
 (2)
 (6)
 (4)
 (1)
 (6)
 (5)
 (1)
 (6)
 (1)
 (1)
 (4)
 (1)
 (1)
 (1)
 (3)
 (5)
 (6)
 (1)
 (2)

See also
 2003 IAAF World Cross Country Championships – Men's short race
 2003 IAAF World Cross Country Championships – Junior men's race
 2003 IAAF World Cross Country Championships – Senior women's race
 2003 IAAF World Cross Country Championships – Women's short race
 2003 IAAF World Cross Country Championships – Junior women's race

References

Senior men's race at the World Athletics Cross Country Championships
IAAF World Cross Country Championships